Daykey High School (대기고등학교,大起高等學校) is a private high school located in Jeju, South Korea. It was established in 1983.

External links

Jeju City
High schools in South Korea
Private schools in South Korea
Schools in Jeju Province
Educational institutions established in 1983
1983 establishments in South Korea